Elvira Enid Barney (née Mullens) was an English socialite and actress known professionally as Dolores Ashley. She was tried for the murder of her lover, Michael Scott Stephen, in 1932. The trial was widely reported by the British press. She was later found not guilty, but died four years later in a Paris hotel room.

Barney was part of the Bright Young Things group of socialites and aristocrats in the 1920s.

Early life 
Elvira Mullens was born on 22 January 1904, the daughter of Evelyne Maude Adamson (1874-1962) and stockbroker Sir John Ashley Mullens (1869–1937). Her younger sister Avril Joy Mullens married three times, including a short marriage to Ernest Aldrich Simpson, ex-husband of Wallis Simpson.

In 1924, Elvira attended Lady Benson's Drama Academy, studying under Constance Benson. During this time, she was engaged to Charles Patrick Graves. During the 1924–25 theatre season she appeared  in The Blue Kitten at the Gaiety Theatre.

She met American singer John Sterling Barney at a party in 1927. They were married on 2 August 1928, but John Barney returned to America the following year.

In 1931, Elvira moved to 21 William Mews, Knightsbridge, London, sharing the home with Henry Mervyn Pearce. She later met Michael Scott Stephen while in Paris. He moved into the William Mews sometime before May 1932.

Trial and aftermath 

On 30 May 1932, Barney and Stephen hosted a dinner party at their home. Among the guests were Arthur Jeffress, Hugh Armigel Wade, Sylvia Coke, Denys Skeffington Smyth, Brian Howard, Anton Altmann, Irene MacBrayne, Arthur Streek, and Olivia Wyndham and her then-girlfriend Ruth Baldwin, a longtime companion of Joe Carstairs, and Edward Gathorne-Hardy. Barney, Stephen, and some of their guests then went to The Blue Angel, a private club on Dean Street. The following morning, Stephen died of bullet wounds and Barney was arrested and charged with murder.

Barney was defended at her trial by Sir Patrick Hastings, who portrayed her as the innocent party and a victim of little value. Wade and Jeffress gave testimony. Altmann, Howard, MacBrayne, Coke, Streek, Fester, and Skeffington-Smyth also gave statements, some of which were read in court.

The judge described Hastings' closing remarks as "certainly one of the finest speeches I have ever heard". Barney was found not guilty of murder and manslaughter, but she was convicted of possession of a firearm. The press reported on Barney boasting of killing Stephen at a celebration party following the verdict.

Barney's family disowned her and she moved to France. She was found dead in a Paris hotel room on 25 December 1936 after returning drunk the night before.

Portrayals 
Barney believed the profligate socialite Agatha Runcible in Evelyn Waugh's Vile Bodies was based on her. However, Runcible was a caricature of Elizabeth Ponsonby.

See also 
 Vile Bodies — novel by Evelyn Waugh.

References 

1904 births
1936 deaths
20th-century English actresses
English musical theatre actresses
English socialites
Drug-related deaths in France
People acquitted of murder